Raymond Democrito Cañete Mendoza is a Filipino politician and labor leader, serving as the representative of the Trade Union Congress of the Philippines (TUCP) Party-list and is currently one of the Deputy Speakers in the House of Representatives. He is TUCP's representative to the 14th, 15th, 16th, 17th, 18th, and 19th Congresses of the Republic of the Philippines. As of October 2022, he serves as the President of TUCP, the largest labor center and confederation of labor federations in the Philippines.

He is the son of labor movement leader Democrito “Kito” T. Mendoza.

Mendoza is married to North Cotabato Governor Emmylou Taliño-Mendoza. He is the father of the Representative of the 3rd District of Cotabato and Assistant Majority Leader Ma. Alana Samantha Santos, and Emilio Ramon Mendoza.

Early life and education

Born in Cebu City on July 7, 1962, Raymond Democrito C. Mendoza was introduced to the labor movement at a young age by his father Democrito “Kito” T. Mendoza, the founder of the Trade Union Congress of the Philippines (TUCP).

Mendoza was a Rotary Exchange Student to Vernon, B.C., Canada from 1977 to 1978 for his secondary education. He then earned a degree in philosophy at Immaculate Heart of Mary in 1983. At the University of San Carlos, he obtained a Bachelor of Laws degree and passed the bar examination in 1999. He then entered the Ateneo de Manila University where he earned a master's degree in Business Administration in 2002.

He earned certificates from the International Labour Organization (ILO), completing the Financial Analysis Program for Labor Leaders in Turin, Italy (1995) and Occupational Safety and Health Course also in Turin, Italy (2000).

Career

In 1995, Mendoza started work as an Executive Assistant of the Associated Labor Unions–TUCP (ALU-TUCP). He became the National Vice President for Education and Information in 2001 and acquired the designation of National Vice President for National and International Affairs in 2008. Since April 2016, Mendoza has concurrently served as TUCP's president.

Government career

From 2001 to 2005, Mendoza served as the Assistant Secretary for Policy, Planning, and Ecosystem Research of the Legislative Liaison and Administrative Legal Services of the Department of Environment and Natural Resources (DENR). He was the Head of the Philippines Governing Body in the United Nations Environment Program (UNEP) in Nairobi, Kenya in 2005.

From 2006 to 2009, he served as a Director in the Philippine National Oil Company (PNOC).

Political career

Mendoza is TUCP's Representative to the 14th, 15th, 16th, 17th, 18th, and 19th Congresses of the Republic of the Philippines. 
                        
Mendoza was one of the principal authors of landmark legislation: Pantawid Pamilyang Pilipino Program (4Ps) Act which institutionalizes 4Ps as a national poverty reduction strategy; the Magna Carta of the Poor that guarantees the rights of the poor and establishes the necessary government interventions for poverty alleviation, and the Department of Migrant Workers (DMW) Act which establishes the DMW as the single home for all the needs and concerns of the Overseas Filipino Workers (OFWs). He is also pushing for the passage of the Security of Tenure Bill which seeks to end the prevalent and abusive practice of labor-only contracting.

In the 15th Congress, he served as Chairperson of the Committee on Poverty Alleviation and as vice chairperson of the Committee on Labor and Employment and the Committee on People's Participation.

In the 16th Congress, he served as chairperson in the following committees: Committee on East ASEAN Growth Area (EAGA) from August 2013 to June 2014, Special Committee on Food Security from July to October 2015, and the Committee on Overseas Workers Affairs from October 2015 to June 2016. He also served as the Senior Vice Chairperson of the Ad Hoc Committee on the Bangsamoro Basic Law and the Vice Chairperson of the Committee on Labor and Employment. He was also a member of the Commission on Appointments from July 2014 to June 2015.

In the 17th Congress, he served as the Chairperson of the Committee on Poverty Alleviation.

In the 18th Congress, he served as the Chairperson of the Committee on Overseas Workers Affairs and as Vice Chairperson of the Committee on Labor and Employment and the Committee on Civil Service and Professional Regulation.

He was also a member of the Philippine delegation to the 36th ASEAN Inter-Parliamentary Assembly (AIPA) General Assembly held in Kuala Lumpur, Malaysia in September 2015 and to the 24th Association of Southeast Asian Nations (ASEAN) Summit and the 10th Brunei Darussalam–Indonesia–Malaysia–Philippines East ASEAN Growth Area (BIMP-EAGA) Summit in Nay Pyi Taw, Myanmar in May 2014.

Currently, in the 19th Congress, he serves as a Deputy Speaker of the House of Representatives.

Personal life

Mendoza is married to North Cotabato Governor Emmylou Taliño-Mendoza. He is the father of the Representative of the 3rd District of Cotabato and Assistant Majority Leader Ma. Alana Samantha Santos, and Emilio Ramon Mendoza.

Deputy Speaker Mendoza is also a military reservist with the rank of major in the Reserve Force of the Philippine Army.

References

External links
Raymond Democrito C. Mendoza on the House of Representatives of the Philippines website

Year of birth missing (living people)
Living people
Party-list members of the House of Representatives of the Philippines
Deputy Speakers of the House of Representatives of the Philippines
Filipino trade union leaders